Hassi El Euch is a town and commune in Djelfa Province, Algeria. According to the 1998 census it has a population of 10,834.

Localities 
 Farzoul

References

Communes of Djelfa Province
Djelfa Province